Zeugandra is a genus of plants in the family Campanulaceae. It contains two known species, both endemic to Iran.

 Zeugandra iranica P.H.Davis - 1951
 Zeugandra iranshahrii Esfand. - 1980

References

Campanuloideae
Campanulaceae genera
Flora of Iran